YGX is a South Korean hip hop dance group under YG Entertainment. It is formerly as a record label and entertainment company.

History
Yang Hyun-suk announced, in May 2018, a subsidiary company called YGX would merge with Seungri's DJ label NHR. On June 4, on his official Instagram account, he posted a picture of a business card showing Seungri as the CEO of YGX Entertainment. In 2018, the label launched a dance and vocal academy, called X ACADEMY, where students could potentially be scouted by YG Entertainment as trainees. YGX also currently houses artist VIINI.

In late 2020, YGX actor division and record label was defunct due to focusing only on the dance group.

Exclusive dance teams

Crazy
 RarmG
 Ryeon
 Gahee
 Silvergun
 Bini
 Sseon
 Dany
 Isak
 Maina
 Dayoung

Hitech
 JP
 YSL
 BK
 Deukie
 Dony
 Onestar
 Roki
 Dow
 Heeeeyun

NWX
 Babyzoo
 Leejung Lee
 Yeojin
 Jihyo
 Sonya Choi
 Junho Lee
 Dart 
 Mood Dok
 Redlic
 Taryn

X ACADEMY

Dance choreographers
 Lee Jae-wook (director & main choreographer)
 Kim Hee-jung (main choreographer)
 Leejung Lee (choreographer)

Vocal instructors
 iHwak
 Youn Young-sam
 Sung Su-jin
 Kim Yeon-seo
 Lee Kwan-je
 Youn Nam-ju
 Park Jeon-koo

Former artists

Former actors
 Kwon Hyun-bin (Viini)
 Lee Soo-hyuk
 Joo Woo-jae
 Kwon Han-sol
 Jung Yoon-seok
 Park Tae-in
 Han Seung-yeon
 Woo Kang-min

Former recording artists
 Zayvo (2019–2020)
 Blue.D (2019–2020)
 Anda (2018–2021)

Former producers
 Choice37
 Hae
 Se.A
 1105
 Lil G
 Sonny

Discography

Notes

References

External links

YG Entertainment
2018 establishments in South Korea
South Korean dance groups
Entertainment companies established in 2018